Alyona Apina (Еле́на Евге́ньевна А́пина; maiden name — Levochkina)   is а Soviet and Russian singer, musical performer, actress and songwriter. Her career started in 1988 and continues to this day. For her unique tone of voice and "peculiar Apina's folk style, which she studied at the Faculty of Folk Song at the Saratov Conservatory", she has become one of the most popular Russian musical performers across the former Soviet Union and Honored Artist of the Russian Federation (2002)

Biography 
Alyona was born on August 23, 1964, in the City of Saratov. When she was 5 years old, her parents enrolled her to a local music school in the piano class. She successfully graduated from music school and attended music college. After she graduated from college, she enrolled to the Folk Song Faculty of the Saratov State Conservatory .

1988—1991
While studying at the Conservatory, Alyona was invited by a friend to the summer vacation to make some extra money as a singer in a band, and in 1988–1991, she was the lead singer of Russian female band Kombinaciya. The band's popularity peaked between 1989 and 1993, with major hits such as "Russian Girls", "American Boy", "Accountant" (Бухгалтер), and "Two Slices of Sausage" (Два кусочека колбаски). In 1991 Alyona Apina left the band to pursue a successful career as a solo performer. Her first solo song "Xenia" became an instant hit. In 1992, she released her first solo album 'Street of Love', but her second album "Dance until the morning" is considered to be the most successful. All eight songs from this album have become popular hits that all Russians knew and sang.
In 1994 for the first time in history of Russian pop/folk music Apina produced a musical pop-novel "Limit". The songs for the musical were composed by the renowned Russian poet Mikhail Tanich. The musical "Limit" was very successful and had a full house for 5 days in Moscow and 5 days in St. Petersburg. It was broadcast on the main TV channels of the country.

1991—2000 
Alyona Apina was a popular singer in the 90s and produced several albums during that time; her music videos were regularly filmed and broadcast on main TV channels. In 1998, Alyona Apina received the prestigious Russian music award "Ovation" as the "Best singer of the year". In 1999 she was invited to the Russian TV channel TV Tsentr as a host of the popular musical TV show "Polevaya pochta".
She continued her singing career and toured in Germany, Israel, France, Ireland and many other European countries. As an actress she was involved in many TV projects, including the popular television series "Old Songs of the Main Things" (Старые песни о главном), "Christmas meetings" (Рождественские встречи) with Alla Pugacheva , "Urgent"   and many others.

2001–present
In 2001 she gave a birth to a daughter Ksenia. In 2002 Alena Apina has become a Honored Artist of the Russian Federation. She continues to participate in various TV projects, music festivals and in other events. In 2013 Apina launched a daytime talk show "International with Alyona Apina" (Интернационал с Алёной Апиной). Together with famous guests, she airs and discusses the songs of unknown Russian artists who posted their work on the Internet.

Awards and achievements 

 Honored Artist of the Russian Federation (2002) ;
 Cavalier of the Order of "Service to Art" International Charity Fund "Patrons of the Century" (2007)
 Medal of the Governor of Moscow Region for the achievements in the field of culture and charity events (2012)

Discography

with Kombinaciya 
See Kombinaciya discography

Albums Solo

Compilation albums

Videography

References

External links 
 

1964 births
Living people
Actors from Saratov
Honored Artists of the Russian Federation
Soviet women singers
20th-century Russian women singers
20th-century Russian singers
Musicians from Saratov
Saratov Conservatory alumni